Joseph Daly Nunan Jr. (December 28, 1897 – February 21, 1968) was an American politician from New York.

Life
He was born on December 28, 1897, in Brooklyn.

He was a member of the New York State Assembly (Queens Co., 4th D.) in 1930.

He was a member of the New York State Senate (2nd D.) from 1931 to 1940, sitting in the 154th, 155th, 156th, 157th, 158th, 159th, 160th, 161st and 162nd New York State Legislatures. He was a delegate to the New York State Constitutional Convention of 1938.

He was U.S. Collector of Internal Revenue for the 1st New York District from March 1, 1944 until June 30, 1947. At that time, he was hired by Lawrence Bardin, President of the Indianapolis Brewing Co. and turned an IRS debt of $636,000 into a $35,000 refund. Lawrence Bardin was subsequently convicted of income tax evasion and served ten months in prison.

He was convicted of tax evasion in 1952.  He was convicted of hiding more than $90,000 income. In particular, he had won $1,800 on a bet that Harry Truman would win the election, but he neglected to declare it on his taxes.

He died in February 1968.

Notes

 "Joseph D. Nunan, Jr." at the Political Graveyard

American people convicted of tax crimes
1897 births
1968 deaths
Members of the New York State Assembly
New York (state) state senators
20th-century American politicians